Next is a restaurant in Chicago. It opened  April 6, 2011.
The restaurant  received media interest due to chef Grant Achatz's  success at his first restaurant, Alinea, as well as its unique "ticketed" format:   Next sells pre-priced tickets for specific dates and times in a similar fashion to the way theater, concert and sporting event tickets are sold.


Property
Next is located in Chicago's historic Fulton Market, just north of the West Loop's  "Restaurant Row" on Randolph Street.

Next's operation also includes two on-site bars: The Aviary, previously headed by Charles Joly, and presently headed by Micah Melton, and The Office, an invite-only speakeasy-format bar that seats 14 and is located behind an unmarked metal door in the basement of the building.

Menus
Rather than stick with one type of cuisine, Next completely changes its style every few months, focusing on a different time period, parts of the world, or various abstract themes for each "season" of its menu. 
While themes for the year are often released at the end of the previous season, menu development for each of the season's themes begins in final weeks of the previous menu. Executive Chef Ed Tinoco and Grant Achatz head this process.

These are the past, present, and (known) future menus of Next Restaurant:

Tickets
Through the "Childhood" menu, Next sold tickets through their website in batches. Several tables would be opened up, and announcements were made on their Facebook and Twitter pages when tickets were available. The tickets sold rapidly. Next tickets are transferable, but not refundable or exchangeable. This has sparked the creation of a secondary market for the tickets, which has resulted in reports of people scalping the tickets for several times their face value.

In an attempt to eliminate the secondary market on Next tickets, the sales model was changed in 2012 to follow a season ticket model, where in-advance tickets were only available if patrons purchased tickets for one meal from each of the restaurant's seasonal menus being offered for the year. Additional benefits (including access to the invite-only The Office) were given along with the season tickets with the stipulation that if the tickets were sold, these additional benefits would be lost. For the 2012 season, the wait list during ticket purchasing reached a queue of over 6,600 people. With just over 900 packages available in total for the year, the people who were able to buy the tickets were in line within 8–10 seconds of their release.

Next also releases "Same-Day" tickets via their Facebook page. They guarantee there will be at least one table available via Facebook every day they are open.

Next, Alinea, and The Aviary, each in their own right, served as a testing and development ground for Nick Kokonas's proprietary ticketing system. Kokonas's system allows for dynamic pricing for restaurant tickets/reservations. The system, now held under a new company called Tock, is being commercially offered to restaurants around the country and the world. Some of the earliest adopters include, Thomas Keller's The French Laundry and Per Se and Daniel Patterson's Coi.

Awards 

 AAA 4-Diamond Rating
 Forbes Travel Guide 4 Star Rating
 50 Best Restaurants in Chicago: Zagat, 2017
 Best Restaurant Service in Chicago: Zagat, 2016
 Elite Traveler Top 100 Restaurants in The World- The list. #38, 2016
 Elite Traveler Top 100 Restaurants in The World- The list. #41, 2018
 James Beard Foundation Awards - Best New Restaurant, 2012 
 Best New Restaurant: Jean Banchet Awards, 2011
 Best Fine Dining: Jean Banchet Awards, 2011

References

External links
 

Restaurants in Chicago
Molecular gastronomy
Restaurants established in 2011